There are about 332 known species of moth that had been recorded from São Tomé and Príncipe. Moths (mostly nocturnal) and butterflies (mostly diurnal) together make up the taxonomic order Lepidoptera.

This is a list of moth species which have been recorded in São Tomé and Príncipe, an island nation off the western equatorial coast of Central Africa.

Alucitidae
Alucita atomoclasta (Meyrick, 1934)

Arctiidae
Afrasura discocellularis (Strand, 1912)
Afrasura hieroglyphica  (Bethune-Baker, 1911)
Afrasura pectinatissima  Volynkin & László, 2018
Afrasura saotomensis  Volynkin & László, 2018
Amerila puella (Fabricius, 1793)
Asura thomensis Rothschild, 1913
Cyana rufifrons (Rothschild, 1912)
Disparctia thomensis (Joicey & Talbot, 1926)
Euchromia lethe (Fabricius, 1775)
Podomachla apicalis 	Walker, 1854
Podomachla insularis (Talbot, 1929)
Utetheisa pulchella (Linnaeus, 1758)

Cosmopterigidae
Anatrachyntis simplex (Walsingham, 1891)

Cossidae
Eulophonotus myrmeleon Felder, 1874
Eulophonotus nigrodiscalis Yakovlev, 2011
Polyphagozerra coffeae (Nietner, 1861)

Crambidae
Aethaloessa floridalis (Zeller, 1852)
Agathodes thomensis Castel-Branco, 1973
Agrotera albalis Maes, 2003
Bradina itysalis Viette, 1957
Cotachena smaragdina (Butler, 1875)
Diaphana indica (Saunders, 1851
Eudonia thomealis (Viette, 1957)
Glyphodes rhombalis Viette, 1957
Hyalobathra barnsalis (Viette, 1957)
Pardomima martinalis Viette, 1957
Paschiodes scoparialis (Viette, 1957)
Paschiodes thomealis Viette, 1957
Pseudonoorda palealis (Viette, 1957)
Pyrausta zyphalis Viette, 1958
Spoladea recurvalis (Fabricius, 1775)
Syllepte amelialis Viette, 1957
Syllepte lagoalis Viette, 1957

Elachistidae
Ethmia spyrathodes Meyrick, 1922

Erebidae
Achaea faber Holland, 1894
Dysgonia angularis (Boisduval, 1833)
Erebus walkeri (Butler, 1875)
Eudocima fullonia (Clerck, 1764)
Lygephila pastinum (Treitschke, 1826)
Hypena obacerralis Walker, [1859]
Hypena strigata (Fabricius, 1794)
Hypena varialis Walker, 1866

Gelechiidae
Theatrocopia roseoviridis Walsingham, 1897

Geometridae
Anoectomychus lautipars (Prout, 1927)
Antitrygodes acinosa Prout, 1932
Ascotis glaucotoxa (Prout, 1927)
Asthenotricha unipecten (Prout, 1915)
Bathycolpodes subfuscata (Warren, 1902)
Cabera nathaliae Herbulot, 1991
Cabera subalba (Warren, 1901)
Chloroclystis consobrina (Warren, 1901)
Cleora subcincta (Warren, 1901)
Comostolopsis rubristicta (Warren, 1899)
Disclisioprocta natalata (Walker, 1862)
Gymnoscelis birivulata Warren, 1902
Gymnoscelis crassata Warren, 1901
Idaea insularum (Prout, 1927)
Mesocolpia subcomosa Warren, 1901
Pingasa decristata Warren, 1902
Pingasa hypoleucaria (Guenée, 1862)
Problepsis ochripicta Warren, 1901
Racotis squalida (Butler, 1878)
Scopula minorata (Boisduval, 1833)
Scopula quintaria (Prout, 1916)
Thalassodes quadraria Guenée, 1857
Xanthorhoe tamsi D. S. Fletcher, 1963
Zamarada principis Herbulot, 1958
Zamarada tomensis Pierre-Baltus, 2005

Gracillariidae
Aristaea onychota (Meyrick, 1908)

Lasiocampidae
Stoermeriana thomensis Talbot, 1929

Lymantriidae
Crorema quadristigata Talbot, 1929
Eudasychira thomensis (Talbot, 1929)

Noctuidae
Acantuerta thomensis (Jordan, 1904)
Aegocera naveli Le Cerf, 1922
Anticarsia rubricans (Boisduval, 1833)
Chrysodeixis chalcites (Esper, 1789)
Condica pauperata (Walker, 1858)
Conservula cinisigna de Joannis, 1906
Eutelia blandiatrix (Guenée, 1852)
Feliniopsis africana (Schaus & Clements, 1893)
Feliniopsis gueneei (Laporte, 1973)
Feliniopsis hosplitoides (Laporte, 1979)
Lithacodia blandula (Guenée, 1862)
Plusiopalpa dichora Holland, 1894
Trachea chlorochrysa Berio, 1937

Notodontidae
Afrocerura cameroona (Bethune-Baker, 1927)

Oecophoridae
Metachanda citrodesma (Meyrick, 1911)
Stathmopoda holothecta Meyrick, 1934

Plutellidae
Plutella xylostella (Linnaeus, 1758)

Pterophoridae
Exelastis crepuscularis (Meyrick, 1909)
Platyptilia infesta Meyrick, 1934
Platyptilia molopias Meyrick, 1906
Platyptilia toxochorda Meyrick, 1934
Pterophorus niveodactyla (Pagenstecher, 1900)
Stenoptilodes taprobanes (Felder & Rogenhofer, 1875)

Pyralidae
Galleria mellonella (Linnaeus, 1758)
Endotricha altitudinalis (Viette, 1957)
Endotricha tamsi Whalley, 1963
Endotricha thomealis (Viette, 1957)
Endotricha viettealis Whalley, 1963
Plodia interpunctella (Hübner, 1813)

Saturniidae
Bunaea oremansi Bouyer, 2008

Sphingidae
Acherontia atropos (Linnaeus, 1758)
Euchloron megaera (Linnaeus, 1758)
Hippotion celerio  (Linnaeus, 1758)
Hippotion talboti Clark, 1930
Hyles livornica (Esper, 1779)
Hyles tithymali (Boisduval, 1834)
Nephele accentifera (Palisot de Beauvois, 1821)
Temnora fumosa (Walker, 1856)

Tineidae
Erechthias dracaenura (Meyrick, 1934)
Harmaclona tephrantha (Meyrick, 1916)
Opogona antiarcha Meyrick, 1934

Tortricidae
Afroploce karsholti  Aarvik, 2004
Anthozela macambrarae  Razowski & Wojtusiak, 2014
Astronauta stellans (Meyrick, 1922)
Choristoneura dinota  (Meyrick, 1918)
Choristoneura occidentalis  (Walsingham, 1891)
Choristoneura saotome 	Razowski & Wojtusiak, 2014
Cosmorrhyncha microcosma Aarvik, 2004
Crocidosema plebejana Zeller, 1847
Dracontogena metamorphica (Meyrick, 1928)
Dracontogena tonitrualis (Meyrick, 1934)
Eccopsis incultana (Walker, 1863)
Eccopsis praecedens Walsingham, 1897
Eucosma sphalerodes Meyrick, 1934
Eucosma tonitrualis Meyrick, 1934
Ercosmocydia terreirana  Razowski & Wojtusiak, 2014
Kennelia albifascies (Walsingham, 1900)
Lobesia aeolopa Meyrick, 1907
Lobesia vanillana 	(Joannis, 1900)
Olethreutes decidua (Meyrick, 1934)
Olethreutes doctrinalis (Meyrick, 1934)
Olethreutes gutturalis (Meyrick, 1934)
Peridaedala algosa (Meyrick, 1912)
Prophaecasia usambarae (Razowski & Wojtusiak, 2014)
Thaumatotibia batrachopa (Meyrick, 1908)
Thaumatotibia leucotreta (Meyrick, 1913)
Tortrix dinota Meyrick, 1918
Tortrix prionistis Meyrick, 1928

Uraniidae
Epiplema scripta ( Talbot, 1929
Phazaca angulata (Talbot, 1929)

Zygaenidae
Saliunca styx (Fabricius, 1775)

References

External links 
 

 01
Sao Tome
Moths
Sao Tomé and Príncipe